Nana is a village in the Bali,  tehsil of Pali District of the Rajasthan state in India. It is located three kilometres from the railway station of the same name on the Ahmedabad-Ajmer railway line. Virampura, Bhagal, Chamunderi, Velar, Bhimana, Amalia, Serla, Chimanpura are nearly village. Pindwada-Bali road is just passing near by Nana. Virampura is close to Nana just one km. Nana just became sub-block division declared. Nana police station is also located at railway station just two km from town.nearby city is pindwara 20 km, Sumerpur 40 km, Sheoganj 40 km, Shirohi 42 km, Aburoad 70 km from Nana.  nearest airport is udaipur 120 km away. and jodhpurs is 200 km. District headquarter pali is 100 km from Nana.

Demographics 
Nana had a population of 12,298 according to the Census 2001. Males were 6288 of the population and females were 6010.
The neighbour surroundings are villages like Virampura,  Chamunderi Ranawatan, Bera, Kothar, Pindwara, Malnoo.

References

 Nana Population
 Nana Geographical details

Villages in Pali district